Matthieu Valverde (born 14 May 1983) is a French former professional footballer who played as a goalkeeper.

Career
Valverde began his professional career at Girondins de Bordeaux. After the departure of second-choice keeper Frédéric Roux, Valverde was given the #1 shirt and was set to serve as understudy to French international Ulrich Ramé. While Roux was at the club, Valverde made only two league appearances in three years. Bordeaux won the Coupe de la Ligue in 2007, but Ramé started and Valverde was left on the bench. However two years later Bordeaux won the Coupe de la Ligue again but this time roles were reversed; Valverde played and Ramé was left on the bench. He also made 12 appearances as Bordeaux won the 2008–09 Ligue 1 title. On 24 July 2009, Valverde joined recently promoted club US Boulogne. On 9 December, due to numerous injuries suffered by their goalkeepers, Toulouse FC acquired Valverde from Boulogne.

Lyon
With Olympique Lyonnais' reserve keepers Remy Vercoutre and Anthony Lopes both missing through injury, Valverde was brought in until the end of the 2011–12 season to deputise for Lyon's first choice goalkeeper, Hugo Lloris.

Honours
Bordeaux
Ligue 1: 2008–09
Trophée des Champions: 2008
Coupe de la Ligue: 2006–07, 2008–09

References

External links
 

1983 births
Living people
French people of Spanish descent
Sportspeople from Montreuil, Seine-Saint-Denis
French footballers
Footballers from Seine-Saint-Denis
Association football goalkeepers
Ligue 1 players
Championnat National 2 players
Cypriot First Division players
FC Girondins de Bordeaux players
US Boulogne players
Toulouse FC players
Olympique Lyonnais players
Anorthosis Famagusta F.C. players
Ethnikos Achna FC players
Enosis Neon Paralimni FC players
Cypriot Second Division players
French expatriate footballers
French expatriate sportspeople in Cyprus
Expatriate footballers in Cyprus